New Horizons is a U.S. spacecraft which made a historic flyby of Pluto in July 2015.

New Horizons may also refer to:

Boats
New Horizons 26, a 1958 American sailboat design by Sparkman & Stephens

Education
New Horizons Computer Learning Centers, an IT training company
New Horizons Governor's School for Science and Technology, a magnet school for southeastern Virginia students
The New Horizon College Minna, school in Nigeria

Film and television
New Concorde, a film distribution and product company formerly known as Concorde-New Horizons
New Horizons Film Festival, a film festival in Wrocław, Poland
ROH New Horizons, a 2008 US professional wrestling pay-per-view event by Ring of Honor
The Orville: New Horizons, 2022 season 3 of U.S. TV show The Orville

Government, politics and military
New Horizons (strategy), a UK government strategy for mental health
New Horizons (Cyprus), a political party in Cyprus
Operation New Horizons or Beyond the Horizons, a set of US military operations

Music

Albums
New Horizons (Flyleaf album) (2012)
New Horizons (Charles McPherson album) (1978)
New Horizons (Connie Smith album) (1978)
New Horizons (The Sylvers album) (1977)
New Horizons (Dottie West album) (1983)

Songs
"New Horizons", by the Moody Blues from Seventh Sojourn, 1972
"New Horizons", the theme song for the Disney attraction Horizons
"New Horizons", Channel 9 Australia's cricket theme written by Brian Bennett
"New Horizons", a song written by Brian May in honour of the New Horizons space probe

Video games
Animal Crossing: New Horizons, a 2020 video game released by Nintendo
GregTech: New Horizons, a 2016 Minecraft modpack released by DreamMasterXXL
Uncharted Waters: New Horizons, a 1993 video game released by Koei

Other media
New Horizons (art movement) (Ofakim Hadashim), an Israeli art movement
New Horizons (book), a science-fiction anthology edited by August Derleth
New Horizons, UK title of Découvertes Gallimard, an encyclopaedic series of illustrated, pocket-sized books
New Horizons (Eckland), a sculpture by Don Eckland on the University of Oregon campus, Eugene, Oregon, U.S.

See also

New Horizon (disambiguation)